Slaughter Branch is a stream in northern Franklin County in the U.S. state of Missouri. It is a tributary to Brushy Creek.

The source area for the stream lies just south of Campbellton and Missouri Route 185.

Slaughter Branch most likely derives its name from George Slaughterback, a pioneer citizen.

See also
List of rivers of Missouri

References

Rivers of Franklin County, Missouri
Rivers of Missouri